Jagor's sphenomorphus (Pinoyscincus jagori)  is a species of skink, a lizard in the family Scincidae. The species is endemic to the Philippines. There are two recognized subspecies.

Etymology
The specific name, jagori, is in honor of German naturalist Fedor Jagor.

Habitat

Description
Dorsally, P. jagori is brown, with darker and lighter variegations. The tail length exceeds the SVL.

Reproduction
P. jagori is oviparous.

Subspecies
Two subspecies are recognized as being valid, including the nominotypical subspecies.
Pinoyscincus jagori grandis 
Pinoyscincus jagori jagori 
Nota bene: A trinomial authority in parentheses indicates that the subspecies was originally described in a genus other than Pinoyscincus.

References

Further reading
Binaday JWB, Amarga AKS, Barrameda ES Jr, Bonagua BJM (2017). "Amphibians and Reptiles in the Vicinity of Bulusan Lake, Bulusan Volcano Natural Park, Sorsogon, Philippines". Philippine Journal of Science 146 (3): 339–351.
Boulenger GA (1887). Catalogue of the Lizards in the British Museum (Natural History). Second Edition. Volume III. ... Scincidæ ... . London: Trustees of the British Museum (Natural History). (Taylor and Francis, printers). xii + 575 pp. + Plates I–XL. ("Lygosoma jagorii ", p. 240).
Linkem CW, Diesmos AC, Brown RM (2011). "Molecular systematics of the Philippine forest skinks (Squamata: Scincidae: Sphenomorphus): testing morphological hypotheses of interspecific relationships". Zoological Journal of the Linnean Society 163 (4): 1217–1243. (Pinoyscincus jagori, new combination).
Peters W (1864). "Über die Eidechsenfamilie der Scincoiden, insbesondere über die Schneider'schen, Wieggman'schen und neue Arten des zoologischen Museums". Monatsberichte der Königlichen Preussischen Akademie der Wissenschaften zu Berlin 1864: 44–58. ("Lygosoma (Hinulia) Jagorii ", new species, p. 54). (in German).
Taylor EH (1922). The Lizards of the Philippine Islands. Manila: Government of the Philippine Islands, Department of Agriculture and Natural Resources, Bureau of Science. Publication No. 17. 269 pp. + Plates 1–22. ("Sphenomorphus jagorii grandis ", new subspecies, p. 195–196, Figure 28, a–c). 

Pinoyscincus
Reptiles described in 1864
Taxa named by Wilhelm Peters